Kim Hyun-jung (born April 4, 1976) is a South Korean pop singer.
Well known as the "Long-legged singer", and with the experience of performing in a heavy metal band, Kim made her debut as a female solo singer with the dance-infused "Legend". The song "Breakup with Her" was a fast-tempo song with strong beats that shot Kim quickly to the top. The song "Lonely Love" was also a great hit. Since her debut, Kim Hyun-jung has succeeded in releasing great songs, usually dance numbers.

In 1997, Kim catapulted to stardom almost instantly after her debut, with her distinctively high voice and slim figure - the ordinary image of a female Korean singer by today’s standards, but a rarity at the time.

Discography

Studio albums

Special albums

Extended plays

Singles

Awards

Notes

References

External links
 Official website
 Instagram
 YouTube

1976 births
K-pop singers
Living people
South Korean women pop singers
MAMA Award winners
21st-century South Korean singers
21st-century South Korean women singers